Nayanatara is a 2021 Indian Kannada language soap opera which premiered on 8 February 2021 airing on Udaya TV. The serial stars Chaitra Sakkari, Ashwini and Dhanush in lead roles.

Cast
Chaitra Sakkari as Nayana
Ashwini as Tara, Nayana's younger sister
Dhanush as Rahul
Sandhya Venkatesh

Adaptations

References

2021 Indian television series debuts
Kannada-language television shows
Udaya TV original programming